The following is a list of presently operating intercity bus stops in Wisconsin with regular service. The list excludes charter buses, local transit buses, paratransit systems, and trolleybus systems. The following companies provide intercity bus service in Wisconsin as of September 2022:

 Amtrak Thruway
 Badger Bus
 Flixbus
 Greyhound Lines
 Indian Trails
 Jefferson Lines
 Lamers Bus Lines
 Megabus
 Tornado Bus Company
 Van Galder Bus Company
 Wisconsin Coach Lines

Stops
This is the list of 71 active intercity bus stops serving 54 cities in Wisconsin. This list does not include stops that are served only by commuter buses and not intercity buses. This list also does not include Tornado Bus Company stops, due to the difficulty of acquiring information on routes and stop locations.

Notes

The following intercity bus stops in Illinois and Minnesota connect with local transit systems which operate in Wisconsin.

Former

See also 
 List of Amtrak stations
 List of intercity bus stops in Illinois
 List of intercity bus stops in Iowa

References

External links
 WisDOT 2022 Intercity Bus Map
 WisDOT 2022 Get Around Guide

Bus transportation in Wisconsin
Bus stations in Wisconsin
Transportation in Wisconsin